Two ships in the United States Navy have been named USS Thomas for Clarence Crase Thomas:

See also
 , ex-Minnewaska (Atlantic Transport Line) ex Persia (Hamburg-American Packet Company) steamer serving as U.S. Army Transport 1898–1929.
 

United States Navy ship names